Slowik or Słowik is a surname. Notable people with the surname include:

Bob Slowik (born 1954), American football coach
Bobby Slowik (born 1987), American football coach 
Carol Thomson Slowik, American college track and field coach
Dariusz Slowik (born 1977), Polish-Canadian discus thrower
Igal Slovik (born 1968), Israeli General
Jakub Słowik (born 1991), Polish footballer
Julian Slowik, The Menu (2022 film) character
Kenneth Slowik (born 1954), American cellist, viol player and conductor
Peter Slowik (born 1957), American classical violist
Ryan Slowik, American football coach

Other
Słowik, Łódź Voivodeship
Słowik, Świętokrzyskie Voivodeship, Poland
Słowik, Będzin County, Silesian Voivodeship, Poland
Słowik, Częstochowa County, Silesian Voivodeship, Poland
CWL SK-1 Słowik

See also

Polish-language surnames